Bhagyawati is an 1888 novel by Shardha Ram Phillauri. The book is now acknowledged as the one of the first novels in Hindi. Previously, Lala Sri Niwas had written his Hindi novel Pariksha guru, which was published in 1882. Bhagyawati is believed to have been written mainly in Amritsar and was first published in 1888.

According to The Tribune (India), the novel was written specifically to "bring an awakening" amongst Indian women. The book's main character was a woman, and it offered a progressive perspective on women's rights and status.  At a time when widows were considered unholy and impure, child marriage was common, and newborn girls were often killed, the novel advocated widow marriage, condemned child marriage, and affirmed the equality of male and female children.  The book was often given to daughters at marriage as a part of the dowry.

Notes

19th-century Indian novels
1888 novels
Feminist novels
Works about widowhood
Hindi-language novels
Hindi-language literature